Vandse is a village in Kundapura taluk (sub district) of Udupi district, Karnataka state, India. The population is about 2500. Chakra nadi is running along the village.

External links
 Vandse population

Villages in Udupi district